John de la Pole may refer to:

John de la Pole (died c.1397), MP for Derbyshire (UK Parliament constituency) in 1377 and 1394
John de la Pole (born c.1385), MP for Derbyshire (UK Parliament constituency) in 1416, 1417 and 1426
John de la Pole, 2nd Duke of Suffolk, 2nd Marquess of Suffolk, 5th Earl of Suffolk, (1442–1491/1492)
John de la Pole, 1st Earl of Lincoln (1462/1464–1487), son of the above
Sir John de la Pole, 6th Baronet (1757–1799), Member of Parliament